Extreme Ghostbusters is an American animated television series based on the Ghostbusters franchise. It is a spin-off to the animated series The Real Ghostbusters. The series originally aired on the syndicated Bohbot Kids Network's "Extreme Block" in 1997 and features a team of college-aged Ghostbusters led by veteran Ghostbuster Egon Spengler. In some TV listings, the series was called Ghostbusters Dark.

Plot
Set years after the end of The Real Ghostbusters, lack of supernatural activity has put the Ghostbusters out of business. Each member has gone their separate ways save for Dr. Egon Spengler, who still lives in the firehouse to monitor the containment unit, take care of Slimer, further his studies, and teach a class on the paranormal at a local college. When ghosts start to reappear, Egon is forced to recruit his four students as the new Ghostbusters: Kylie Griffin, a goth genius and expert on occultism; Eduardo Rivera, a cynical Latino slacker; Garrett Miller, a young white paraplegic athlete who uses a wheelchair; and Roland Jackson, a studious African-American machinery whiz. Filling out the cast are Janine Melnitz, the Ghostbusters' previous secretary who returns to the job, and Slimer, a hungry ghost.

The series follows the adventures of this "Next Generation" of Ghostbusters tracking down and capturing ghosts all over New York and occasionally beyond the city. The series is styled as a supernatural comedy, following the trend set by its predecessor but with an updated and darker feel. This is reflected by the use of a gritty, rock/punk-inspired variation of Ray Parker Jr.'s song "Ghostbusters" as the opening theme, written by Jim Latham and performed by voice actor Jim Cummings. Recurring themes throughout the series are the new team learning to work together despite their differences, Janine's largely unrequited affection for Egon, the unresolved love-hate relationship between Kylie and Eduardo, and the Ghostbusters' frequent clashes with authority figures who disbelieve their work.

Characters

Slimer (voiced by Billy West) – Slimer remains the most unchanged of all the characters in terms of personality. However, he is given a less cartoony look to fit in with the series' overall style. In "Fear Itself", it's revealed that Slimer is afraid of broccoli (which is ironic, as he has been shown to eat anything). Slimer is very well-meaning, but is often pushed around by the Ghostbusters as he gets in their way and eats continually. His actions often affect the story, usually adversely, though he often acts to fix his mistakes and on a number of occasions has been shown to have a heroic nature and that he can wield a proton pack. He's got a strong rivalry with Eduardo, similar to the one he had with Peter Venkman, though several episodes show that Eduardo – and the other Ghostbusters – do care for him as much as he annoys them. He's been living with Egon for over a decade now, and the two are closer than in the original series; when trying to get Egon to discipline the ghost in "Glutton for Punishment", Janine says she knows the two have been through a lot together, and in "Slimer's Sacrifice" Egon immediately suits up to enter the Containment Unit to rescue him, but after he is attacked by the ghost, Eduardo goes in to save Slimer.
 (voiced by Rino Romano) – seemingly a lazy, sarcastic and somewhat clueless character, Eduardo nevertheless makes himself an integral part of the team by being determined and reliable. Eduardo, along with Garrett, resembles original Ghostbuster Peter Venkman in that, like Venkman, Eduardo is sarcastic, has a penchant for pursuing attractive women, and is generally unscientific and constantly spouts pop culture references. He also reads "J.N. Kline" young-adult horror novels. Eduardo has a long-running subplot dealing with a love/hate relationship between him and Kylie, although it is very much revealed "In Your Dreams" that he has intimate feelings and dreams about her. These feelings are further enforced in that he is usually the one to rescue Kylie from dangerous situations, and vice versa, in several episodes. He once said to Kylie herself that nothing was going to happen to her "while [he's] around". In fact, in the episode "Darkness at Noon" he outright admitted to Kylie, who was possessed by a ghost at the time, that he felt an attraction of sorts when he saw her for the first time and even showed the intention of kissing her when Kylie asked him to. In "The Unseen" he takes the rap for Kylie's mistake, not wanting "the worst day of her life to get any worse". In "Rage", Eduardo reveals to have an older brother, Carlos "Carl" Rivera, an NYPD officer who is angry with Eduardo for not being a police officer like the rest of their family, and thinks the Ghostbuster are a scam, which is why Eduardo kept his job a secret. In the same episode it is also implied that his father is dead (or at least retired) as he and Carlos refer to him in the past tense during a heated argument. In "Fear Itself", it's revealed that Eduardo has a fear of death (specifically his own). He has a vicious rivalry with Slimer, but has ended up working with the ghost, and volunteered to save him in "Slimer's Sacrifice". He also has an on the surface rivalry with Garrett with the two often mocking each other and attempting to one up the other. In spite of this as the series goes on the two seem to have the closest thing to a friendship even though Garrett's enthusiastic personality completely contrasts Eduardo's cynical attitude. The official website claimed he slacks off due to fear of failure. Despite all his cynicism and slacking he demonstrates a reasonably high level of intelligence as in the episode "Eyes of a Dragon" he states how the proton aspect of light works to Kylie and later on how to defeat the ghost of that episode. Eduardo was also the one to smash a cursed orb, causing the eye-stealing ghost to disintegrate in the episode "The Unseen" and also continued the incantation that destroyed the demon of an alternate dimension in which he, Roland and Kylie were imprisoned in the episode "Casting the Runes". Eduardo has also exhibited bouts of jealousy whenever Kylie seemingly flirts with other men and in "Till Death Do Us Start" he showed signs of sheepish nervousness when asked if he and Kylie were together. In an interview and the book "Ghostbusters the Ultimate Visual History" Rino Romano commented that "spiritually, and I know this sounds kind of stupid, but I thought I was born to play that role. Eduardo was basically the loveable character. He's in love with the girl but he's too much of a wuss to admit it. He's both the comic relief and the antihero, and the romantic foil. Extreme Ghostbusters was the best-written show, because it wasn't just about the ghostbusting, it was about the characters".
 (voiced by Tara Strong) – the only member of the new team to have any sort of paranormal knowledge (much like Egon) before signing up as a Ghostbuster, after her friend Jack was a victim of the Grundel. Kylie is in awe of Egon when the series began, but this soon shifts to a more equal footing, and becomes somewhat of the unofficial leader in the field, after Egon. Kylie's calm exterior often sets her as a foil against Eduardo's brashness, as part of the ongoing love/hate dynamic between the two. Although she has never admitted it, she often seemed to appreciate Eduardo's feeling towards her, such as giving a thankful smile on the occasions when he saves her life and vice versa. She is also the one who most commonly wields the Ghost Traps. She is depicted as something of a "Goth" girl, judging by the black hair and lipstick. In the episode "Grease", it is revealed that her parents divorced and she currently lives alone with her cat; she was highly close to her grandmother Rose, who died a year before the show started, and both her interest in the paranormal and Gothic styling are implied to be related to her grandmother's death. In "Fear Itself", it's revealed that Kylie is afraid of maggots as she finds them creepy, and in "Heart of Darkness" she used to be "Cheerleader of the Year" when she was in the 8th Grade of her junior high school (something she finds mortifying). There is a running gag where she often replies with the sentence, "I'm not a...", followed by what has happened. It is also hinted throughout the series that she's attracted to older, intelligent men. Kylie Griffin also appears in the Ghostbusters comic books published by IDW Publishing. In the comics, she originally only appeared in cameo roles as a worker in Ray Stantz's occult book shop before being made a Ghostbuster in issues starting in 2013.
 (voiced by Alfonso Ribeiro) – the mechanic of the group. Roland is the most level-headed and mechanically gifted of the new Ghostbusters, helping Egon repair and improve the Proton Packs and Ecto-1; his reason for joining Egon's class was seeing the Ecto-1 at an auto show. Roland approaches the paranormal from a practical point-of-view, and in the episode "Fear Itself" reveals that his only fear is the dangerous breakdown of his equipment. In "The Infernal Machine", he became disgruntled that his technological efforts were being taken for granted. Roland's strongest wish is to get into the Ivy League and become a doctor. He's a very staid, square personality, slow to anger, though he came close to striking one of the racists in "The True Face of the Monster"; it's implied he's had to deal with racist attitudes before. Roland has twice come under the mental control of villains, the Siren in "Sonic Youth" and Luko in "The Infernal Machine". "Grease" reveals Roland is the oldest in a lower-middle-class family and volunteers for the Little League and helps the homeless; in "Grundelesque" he has a very mischievous younger brother whom Roland (at first) refuses to believe is a troublemaker. Like Winston, Roland is the only African American member of the team, yet he has a talent with machines like Ray.
 (voiced by Jason Marsden) – despite being paraplegic, Garret has a very 'jock'-like attitude and is a huge fan of extreme sports and attempting mad stunts. In the episode "Grease", it's revealed that Garrett was born with the inability to walk, and throughout the series he only refers to his condition to mock it (and in "Be Careful What You Wish For", uses it as an excuse to dump some work on Eduardo). He also once used it to convince two FBI agents to uncuff him, feigning helplessness. He is the most headstrong and enthusiastic of the new Ghostbusters, often claiming that he's in it only for the adrenaline rush; he was left bitterly disappointed in "Ghost Apocalyptic Future" to learn he was the only Ghostbuster not remembered in the future dystopia. While he studies to be a physical therapist to help other disabled people, his secret dream is to be an NBA star. In "Fear Itself", Garrett is claustrophobic (though he never admits it to anyone), and has a deep disdain towards people who assume disabled people are helpless. He has a rivalry with Eduardo, the two of them constantly bantering and trying to one-up each other. In "Deadliners", we find out Garrett wrote a (bad) horror story starring himself (the other Ghostbusters died on the first page, to their annoyance). Like Ray, Garrett is the most enthusiastic. Garrett is the only Ghostbuster in the history of the franchise never to be made as a toy (all other Ghostbusters received at least two toys, including Louis and Janine), presumably due to the implausibility of assembling a miniature wheelchair on a production line. Though a prototype figure was made. Bob Higgins has said that during a focus group of young children, the creators found Garrett was the most popular character: "When we asked... which of these characters would you want to be and they all wanted to be Garrett, they all wanted to be the guy that does the crazy things. They all wanted to be the guy that was the leader and they all kind of saw him as the leader of this group [even though he wasn't]".
Egon Spengler (voiced by Maurice LaMarche) – the only original Ghostbuster to become a regular in this spin-off series, Egon takes on the role of mentor for the new team of Ghostbusters. He still lives in the fire house with Slimer, enabling the building to become the Ghostbusters headquarters when paranormal activity starts again. Before the first ghost escaped, Egon was teaching classes on the paranormal at New York City College – four people taking his class was double the usual. He usually leaves the field work to the new members, opting to provide audio back-up from the fire house and information on their current adversary, but has joined them in action when he feels the crisis requires his presence. Other than ghosts, he also has an interest in mold and started to grow cultures in Eduardo's bathtub when the two roomed together. He continues to have romantic tension with Janine. The official website listed his age at 41 though in "The Sphinx", while suffering a bit of a mid-life crisis, he said he was 39.
Janine Melnitz (voiced by Pat Musick) – the Ghostbusters' original receptionist returns to the role after she is reunited with Egon by taking his Paranormal 101 class at New York City College. Like Egon, she watches over the new team, and on occasion contributes an active part in ghostbusting. According to Egon, she also functions as the team's accountant and collector. She also shows off obvious signs of attraction to Egon, but he is completely oblivious to this, which only frustrates her. The official website said "she's spent the last decade flitting from job to job... trying not to pine for Prof. Spengler".

Production
Showrunner Bob Higgins told Ability Magazine that the decision to create a new Ghostbusters was taken by the studio, which hoped to reinvigorate a lucrative franchise. Originally announced as Super Ghostbusters in 1996, the initial press release had Janine, teaching history at a local college, bringing together a new team with "a hip new attitude" to face a new plague of ghosts; "short on time and more than a little desperate, Janine turns to four of her teenaged students". Egon would be "huddled in front of a computer screen, battling program bugs instead of spooks".

The show's creators decided "to put together a team of misfits in a way, people that you would not necessarily associate with being superheroes on television"; hence Eduardo as a slacker, Roland as a "square", and Kylie as moody and sarcastic, with Garrett as the balance, "an adrenaline junkie... who could kind of kick start the team". Fil Barlow, the designer, was given rough outlines and originally designed all the characters bar Eduardo as girls (Garrett as Lucy and Roland as Julia), with Egon originally designed as bearded and robed. This aspect would be dropped. Barlow pitched "Egon as an ambassador to the ghost realm trying to stop an impending war on the other side".

During production, Lucy/Garrett was found to be quite bland and annoying until producer Jeff Kline suggested putting the character in a wheelchair; Higgins stated this made Garrett more interesting to write, as he was now "one of these guys that takes what he is given and makes the best of it and really lives up to any potential that he has". When designed as Lucy, she was given proton-blasting callipers and crutches, but producer Richard Raynis requested the wheelchair instead (Barlow attempted to show a female character could "be fearless and gung ho" but Raynis requested the gender change). The show ended up winning an award from the Los Angeles Commission on Disabilities for its work on Garrett.

Various elements would be changed before airing: Egon would replace Janine as the teacher, Slimer lost a goblin sidekick called Gnat, and Garrett was originally "Lucas". Roland was originally a clumsy "gentle giant", Eduardo had a dream of running in the Olympics, and Lucas had a hair-trigger temper (some of these still made it to the character profiles on the EGB website).

The team that helmed Extreme Ghostbusters consisted of many producers and writers that had done work on The Real Ghostbusters, including Raynis. As a result, the show was made as an explicit sequel to Real. This made the show one of the few direct sequels to a 1980s cartoon series — other franchises, such as Masters of the Universe and Teenage Mutant Ninja Turtles, opted for series relaunches — and as such opted for a more realistic passage of time. Maurice LaMarche was brought back to play Egon Spengler — though Frank Welker and Laura Summer did not return to play Slimer and Janine, respectively. The series would start to have more explicit tie-ins to Real as it went on — "Slimer's Sacrifice" referenced Egon entering the Containment Unit in an episode of Real Ghostbusters: "Xmas Marks the Spot"; "Grundelesque" was a direct sequel to Real Ghostbusters episode "The Grundel", bringing back the eponymous villain and revealing Kylie lost a friend during its first attack. Finally - and notably - was the two-part finale "Back in the Saddle", which featured the remaining original Ghostbusters returning and teaming up with their successors— with Dave Coulier (the second voice of Peter Venkman), Buster Jones (the second voice of Winston Zeddemore), and Frank Welker (the voice of Ray Stantz) all reprising their roles.

Episodes

Broadcast
The series originally aired on the Syndicated BKN block in 1997.

The show was aired on ABS-CBN in the Philippines in 1999.

The show first aired in the Republic of Ireland on RTE Two from 19 February 1998 to 1999.
Years later, a short rerun was shown on the same channel in the summer of 2007.

In 2021, to celebrate the upcoming release of Ghostbusters: Afterlife, episodes of both The Real Ghostbusters and Extreme Ghostbusters were released onto the official Ghostbusters YouTube channel.

Home media
In 1999, three VHS volumes of the show were released by Columbia TriStar Home Video, all of which are now out of print. These videotapes were available to purchase separately or as a packaged boxed set containing all three volumes. The episodes included on the VHS volumes were:

Volume 1: "Darkness at Noon, Part 1", "Darkness at Noon, Part 2"
Volume 2: "The Infernal Machine", "Grundelesque"
Volume 3: "Back in the Saddle, Part 1", "Back in the Saddle, Part 2"

A two-disc DVD set of the series was released in Australia on June 2, 2009 and in the United Kingdom on June 15 the same year, along with Germany, Italy and the Netherlands, all containing the first thirteen episodes of the series, with the UK releases being slightly edited to remove scenes of horror and threat.

There is currently no plan to release the series on DVD in the United States.

The series was re-released in the UK on the 27th of June 2016, once again featuring the first 13 episodes.

In January 2021, the episodes were officially uploaded weekly by the official Ghostbusters YouTube Channel in High Definition.

Reception and legacy
In a retrospective of the show, SFX referred to the "consensus that any extension of the Ghostbusters brand requires a whole new team of newbies to take on the mantle" and that Extreme Ghostbusters was the first time it was put into practice. The failure of the show, blamed by the showrunners on poor US scheduling and the decline of non-educational children's syndication in favor of carriage on networks such as Fox Kids and Kids' WB and cable channels ("broadcast mid-morning in a slot only suitable for pre-schools", though some American stations still did carry the show between 3:00pm and 5:00pm in the afterschool period), was seen by SFX as showing "the appeal of Ghostbusters was only partially the concept... that it's the characters we love above all must be a sobering thought for anyone charged with rebooting Ghostbusters again". The show was also noted for being aimed at "a slightly more adolescent audience with a tougher edge", "clearly intended to test the boundaries of child-friendly horror" and the Eduardo/Kylie relationship pushed the edges of the ratings.

The character of Kylie Griffin appeared in the IDW comics in the 2010s.

Merchandise and other media
The cartoon series generated a line of action figures released by Trendmasters. The line included Roland, Eduardo, Kylie, and several ghosts, as well as an updated version of Egon Spengler, and the Ecto-1; Garrett did not have a figure released, although collectors have found a prototype figure. Also released was a role playing Proton Pack and Ghost Trap.

Website
The original website contained a Flash tour of the Firehouse, character profiles, descriptions of the ghosts fought, and a Flash game. Some of the character details in the profiles had never made it into an episode.

The "Spengler's Spirit Guide" section contained journal entries by "Egon" himself, about haunted areas and the how-to of ghostbusting. Two of the entries, The Bermuda Triangle and The Jersey Devil, were topics that showed up in episodes.

Video games
Three video games based on the series were also created, Extreme Ghostbusters for the Game Boy Color, Extreme Ghostbusters: Code Ecto-1 for Game Boy Advance and Extreme Ghostbusters: The Ultimate Invasion for the PlayStation. There are also two PC games: Extreme Ghostbusters: Zap The Ghosts! and Extreme Ghostbusters Creativity Centre.

Notes

References

External links
Description of the show (via Internet Archive)

Extreme Ghostbusters action figures Trendmasters Archive
Extreme Ghostbusters at Don Markstein's Toonopedia. Archived from the original on June 26, 2016.
Extreme Ghostbusters official 2nd website archive
Official website (via Internet Archive)

1990s American animated television series
1990s American horror television series
1990s American supernatural television series
1997 American television series debuts
1997 American television series endings
American children's animated comic science fiction television series
American children's animated science fantasy television series
American children's animated horror television series
American children's animated supernatural television series
American sequel television series
Animated television series about ghosts
Animated television shows based on films
Disney Channel original programming
English-language television shows
Fictional quartets
First-run syndicated television programs in the United States
Ghostbusters television series
Occult detective fiction
Television series by Adelaide Productions
Television series by Sony Pictures Television
Television shows adapted into video games
Television shows set in New York (state)